Peterboro Street Elementary School is a historic elementary school building located at Canastota in Madison County, New York.  It was built in 1927 in the Gothic Revival style.  It is a large brick and concrete building whose front facade features a broad, projecting central pavilion flanked by broad, two bay wings.

It was added to the National Register of Historic Places in 1986.

References

School buildings on the National Register of Historic Places in New York (state)
Gothic Revival architecture in New York (state)
School buildings completed in 1927
Schools in Madison County, New York
National Register of Historic Places in Madison County, New York
1927 establishments in New York (state)